Letheobia graueri, also known as the Lake Tanganyika gracile blind snake, Grauer's gracile blind snake, Sternfeld's beaked snake, Grauer's blind snake, is a species of snake in the family Typhlopidae. The species is endemic to Middle and East Africa.

Etymology
The specific name, graueri, is in honor of Rudolf Grauer, an Austrian zoologist and explorer.

Geographic range
It is found in Burundi, eastern Democratic Republic of the Congo, Rwanda, western Tanzania, and western Uganda.

References

Further reading
Sternfeld R (1912). "Reptilia". pp. 197–279. In: Schuboltz R (editor) (1912). Wissenschaftliche Ergebnisse der Deutschen Zentral-Afrika Expedition 1907–1908, unter Führung Adolf Friedrichs, Herzogs zu Mecklenburg. Band IV [Volume 4], Zoologie II. Leipzig: Klinkhard & Biermann. 405 pp. + Plates I-XI. (Typhlops graueri, new species, p. 264). (in German).

Letheobia
Snakes of Africa
Vertebrates of Burundi
Reptiles of the Democratic Republic of the Congo
Vertebrates of Rwanda
Reptiles of Tanzania
Reptiles of Uganda
Reptiles described in 1912
Taxa named by Richard Sternfeld